Édouard Harlé (1850, Toulouse – 1922, Bordeaux) was a French railway engineer (Ingénieur des ponts et chaussées) and prehistorian.

Édouard Harlé was a Director of the Chemin de Fer du Midi.

His collections of prehistoric artefacts are held by Muséum d'histoire naturelle de Bordeaux and Muséum de Toulouse.

References
Arnaud Hurel, L'institutionnalisation de l'archéologie préhistorique en France métropolitaine (1852-1941) et l'Institut de Paléontologie Humaine Fondation Albert Ier de Monaco (2004)
Marc Groenen, Pour une histoire de la préhistoire: le paléolitique  (1994)

Prehistorians
French civil engineers
Engineers from Toulouse
1850 births
1922 deaths